Ts'ehlanyane National Park is a National Park in Lesotho. It is located in the Maloti Mountains in Leribe District, and is part of the larger Maloti-Drakensberg Transfrontier Conservation Area.  This Lesotho northern park protects a high-altitude,  patch of rugged wilderness, including one of Lesotho’s only stands of indigenous forest with a number of rare undergrowth plants that are unique to this woodland habitat.

The name "Ts'ehlanyane" is the local common name for the berg bamboo (Thamnocalamus tessellatus), from which the river and park take their name. It is fitting that the park should bear the name of this Drakensberg endemic plant, as it may be the most important refuge for this plant in the entire Maloti-Drakensberg mountain range.

History 

This proclaimed protected pristine area lies at the junction of the Ts'ehlanyane and the Holomo rivers. It owes its origin to the access road to the "Mamohale tunnel" (May 1991), which was the first adit drive for the Lesotho Highlands Water Project.

Terrain 

This Lesotho northern park protects a high-altitude,  patch of rugged wilderness, including one of Lesotho's few stands of indigenous forest with a number of rare undergrowth plants that are unique to this woodland habitat. Here indigenous "ouhout" (Leucosidea) trees of significant size are preserved.

The diversity of habitat types is exceptionally wide and derived from the large altitudinal range that the park has.

Biota 

Avifauna: Species of interest include the  There are also the alpine endemics, such as the 
Fauna: Indigenous mammals include  Snakes include the berg adder.
Flora: On the banks of the rivers and streams are stands of berg bamboo which are of significant cultural significance to the Basotho people. Berg bamboo is the host plant for an endangered butterfly species, the bamboo sylph Metisella syrinx. The reserve also encompasses a reasonable proportion of very rare mountain "fynbos" that do not occur anywhere else in the world. Also recorded are in excess of 220 flowing plant species.Lesotho's national plant is the spiral aloe, among other varied and abundant alpine flora, including over 180 flowering species.

Bird species 

Bird species found in the park include:

Black-headed heron
Cattle egret
Hamerkop
Yellow-billed duck
African black duck
Bearded vulture
Black-winged kite
Steppe buzzard
Jackal buzzard
Lanner falcon
Rock kestrel
Grey-winged francolin
Helmeted guineafowl
Rock pigeon
Cape turtle dove
Laughing dove
Red-chested cuckoo
Diederik cuckoo
Spotted eagle owl
Black swift
Speckled mousebird
Pied barbet
Ground woodpecker
Long-billed lark
Red-capped lark
European swallow
Orange-breasted rockjumper
Spotted flycatcher
Fairy flycatcher
Cape wagtail
Rock martin
Banded martin
Black crow
Pied crow
White-necked raven
Red-eyed bulbul
Cape rock thrush
Sentinel rock thrush
Mountain chat
Familiar chat
Stonechat (subsp. oreobates)
Orange-throated longclaw
Fiscal shrike
Pied starling
Red-winged starling
Malachite sunbird
Cape white-eye
House sparrow
Cape sparrow
Cape weaver
Masked weaver
Pin-tailed whydah
Black-throated canary
Cape canary
Yellow canary
Cape bunting
Rock bunting

Wild flower and shrub species 

Wild flowers and shrubs recorded at Ts'ehlanyane National Park on the Matsa-Mararo route via Lets'a-le-ts'o and the lower bridle path (4 × 4 track) that leads to Holomo Pass(* = exotic)

 * Cannabis sativa
 * Persicaria lapathifolia: exotic, robust annual herb in damp areas
 * Solanum sp. (wild potato)
 Ajuga ophrydis (bugle-plant)
 Alepidea amatymbica (Lesoko): large serrated (basal) leaves, tall herb. Tea made from leaves applied as cough and cold remedy 
 Alepidia cf. woodii: small herb with white, star-like flowers
 Anisodontea julii subsp. pannosa (lefeta; mountain hibiscus; wildestokroos): shrub, flowers shiny pink. On the Holomo Pass bridle path, often near streams in scrub forest.
 Argyrolobium tuberosum Argyrolobium sp.: yellow pea-flowers
 Asclepias fruticosa Berkheya cirsiifolia: thorny sub-shrub with white daisy-like flowers, damp Basalt slopes at approx. 
 Cephalaria natalensis Clematis brachiata: common climber esp. on dead cheche trees next to the 4 × 4 track leading to the Holomo Pass bridle path
 Coccinia sp. or Zehneria sp.: climber in cheche forest, deeply lobed leaves, hairy. Small cucumber-like fruit of approx.  in length (slightly bitter, probably poisonous)
 Conium sp.: tall herb >, slightly aromatic
 Cotyledon orbiculata: on eroded basalt cliffs (south-east facing) next to the Ts'ehlanyane river
 Crassula cf. natalensis: small succulent on damp rocks next to the Lets'a-le-ts'o trail
 Crassula sarcocaulis: on eroded basalt cliffs (south-east facing) next to the Ts'ehlanyane river
 Diascia cf. barberae Dierama cf. cooperi: white, with mauve and yellow flecks on inside of perianth. Next to 4 × 4 track directly above the conference centre
 Dichilus reflexus Disa cooperi: light pink with long spur, fragrant, evident in the vicinity of the quarry 
 Erica caffrorum: large shrub or small tree
 Erica oatessi: shrub with pink, bottle-shaped flowers
 Eucomis autumnalis subsp. clavata Euphorbia cf. natalensis:  herb
 Geranium cf. wakkerstroomianum Geranium pulchrum other Geranium spp.
 Gladiolius crassifolius Gladiolius dalenii Gunnera perpensa (qobo; wild rhubarb; rivierpampoen): usually in large stands, marshy places, or sub-shade
 Habenaria epipactidea: greenish flowers with long white spur, one example seen on the 4×4 track leading to the Holomo Pass bridal path
 Helichrysum cooperi Helichrysum herbaceum: golden yellow everlasting with small overlapping leaves
 Helichrysum mundtii Helichrysum splendidum Jamesbritennia sp.: ill-aromatic herb, or sub-shrub, on path, disturbed soil
 Lobelia spp.
 Lotononis sp.: : greyish sub-shrub, blue pea-flowers
 Myssotis semiamplexicaulis (Forget-me-not): common on disturbed areas i.e. the path, pink – deep blue
 Orchidaceae: small leaves similar to Agapanthus, Disa thodei?
 Orchidaceae: yellow-green flowers with two wings, long spur, probably Habenaria epipactidea Oxalis smithiana: leaves are deeply divided, lobes narrow. Pink flowers. Common on the lower Lets'a-le-ts'o trail
 Passerina drakensbergensis (berg gonna): large shrub in scrub 
 Pelargonium cf. ranuncullophyllum: herb with small white flowers, tiny pink flecks on the inside of petals. Leaves with purplish brown mark. Common on the lower Lets’a-le-ts’o trail
 Pentzia cooperi Phygelius capensis: grassy slopes within cheche forest, damp and rocky moist slopes and on streambanks. Flowers curved. 
 Printzia cf. pyrifolia : grassy slopes within cheche forest
 Plectranthus grallatus: common in shade of cheche forest 
 Polygala cf. rhinostigma: small perennial herb, pink flowers 
 Polygala cf. uncinata: perennial herb, purple flowers 
 Polygala virgata: common shrub next to 4×4 track leading to the Holomo Pass bridal path
 Rumex cf. saggitatus: climber on dead/burnt cheche en route to the Matsa-mararo falls from Lets'a-le-ts'o. Heart-shaped leaves, conspicuous fruit: papery 3-winged, pink-red en masse
 Satyrium parviflorum: small yellowish green flowers on long spike, petals drying brown soon after flowering. Basal leaves, heart-shaped, fairly large
 Scabiosa cf. columbaria Schizoglossum artropurpureum subsp. artropurpureum Scilla natalensis : on basalt cliffs south of the Ts’ehlanyane river
 Selago cf. melliodora: white inflorescence, honey scented, next to path near Matsa-mararo falls
 Selago galpinii Senecio macrocephalus Senecio sp.: common, herbaceous shrub with masses of yellow flowers. Large stands in damp areas or rocky places
 Silene cf. burchelli: pink, near campsite at river deck
 Stachys cf. aethiopica Thalictrum cf. rhyncocarpum: herb, forest floor near and on the lower Lets'a-le-ts'o path, leaves resemble maidenhair fern (Adianthium cappilus-veneris) 
Endangered species in South Africa
 Unknown species: common on disturbed soil, small herb (150 mm), leaves are serrated and spatulate, of particular interest are the discoloured characteristic of the leaves: above green and below purple-pink
 Vernonia hirsuta Wahlenbergia krebsii Xerophyta viscosa: on eroded basalt cliffs (south-east-facing) next to the Ts'ehlanyane river
 Zaluzianskya cf. microsiphon Zaluzianskya smitziae: night-flowering species, common on the trail between Lets'a-le-ts'o and Matsa-mararo falls

 Indigenous tree species in the Park 

Indigenous trees as seen at the campsite, on the lower Lets'a-le-ts'o path en route to Matsa-Mararo falls and the lower bridle path (4x4 track) that leads to Holomo Pass

 *Rosa eglanteria (rosehip): thorny tree, pink flowers followed by orange–red fruit, in scrub forest near river and cheche forest
 Buddleja loricata (lelora; mountain sage; bergsaliehout) very similar to B. salviifolia but leaves are leathery, lanceolate, whilst B. salviifolia leaves are softer and oval/heart-shaped at base. B. loricata usually at higher altitudes than B. salviifolia, but their habitats do overlap(). Inflorescences of B. loricata, smaller, only white, sweetly scented. B. loricata common in the vicinity of Lets'a-le-ts'o.
 Buddleja salviifolia (lelothoane; quilted sage; saliehout) Very similar to B. loricata but leaves and inflorescence differ: see B. loricata (supra). Flowers: fragrant, white to mauve in spring.
 Diospyros austroafricana subsp. africana (liperekisi-tsa-makhoaba, senokonoko; firesticks star-apple; kritikom; vuurmaakbossie; jakkalsbessie) usually a shrub, sometimes small tree, grey appearance. Flowers: pink to red, highly fragrant during springtime.
 Heteromorpha trifoliata (monkhoane; parsley tree; pietersieliebos) small tree with conspicuous bark peeling off in papery flakes, on steep slopes and cliffs where protection from veld fires esp. vicinity of the Matsa-mararo falls. Flowers and seeds resemble parsley.
 Leucosidea sericea (oldwood: ouhout), according to an entomological study made on the cheche of the Golden Gate area (EFS), these trees are the habitat of 117 species of beetles
 Myrsine africana (semapo; Cape myrtle; mirting) evergreen shrub with very small leaves, toothed in upper half, rarely a tree
 Rhamnus prinoides (mofifi; dogwood; blinkblaar) small tree, often in shade of cheche forest. Glossy-green leaves, small red–black berries
 Rhus divaricata (kolitsane; rusty-leaved current; roesblaartaaibos) shrub or small tree with trifoliate leaves, slightly leathery, dark olive green above, grey-green–rusty-brown hairs beneath, large numbers of small yellow to brown berries  in diameter.

 Other tree species 

Other trees expected to occur in the area include: 
 Bowkeria verticillata (isiduli; umbaba; southern shell-flower) 
 Euclea crispa (mohlakola; blue guarri) 
 Halleria lucida (lebetsa; tree fuchsia; notsung) 
 Passerina montana (lekhapu; mountain gonna)
 Rhus dentata (lebelebele; nana-berry) 
 Rhus pyroides (kolitsane; common taaibos)

 Fern species 
Ferns and fern allies

Underneath shade of cheche forest, an abundance of ferns occur: Polystichum spp. and Cheilanthes quadripinnata. Pteris cretica in damp places often near boulders. In exposed areas on rocky mountain slopes, typical poikylohydrous species evident like the resurrection fern and Cheilanthes eckloniana. Selaginella'' spp. expected on exposed rock surfaces.

Location 
The park is located deep in the northern range of the Maloti Mountains at the foot of the Holomo Pass and only about 45 minutes on tarred road from the South African border post of Caledonspoort, 15 minutes drive from the popular Free State town of Clarens and about 4 hours from O. R. Tambo International Airport).

Activities 
Maliba Lodge accommodation is located within the park 
 Numerous hiking and bridle paths have already been established with the park, one of which is a spectacular 39 km trail linking the Ts'ehlanyane National Park with the Bokong Nature Reserve. 
 Photographic opportunities. Not only is the scenery spectacular, but the fauna and flora offer a boundless variety of photographic subjects.
 Basuto pony rides offer an ideal way to explore nature from a higher vantage point.
 Swimming in the pristine streams and rock pools
 Small to medium-sized game viewing with about 24 species present
 Massage treatments at Maliba Lodge Spa
 Restaurant meals and viewing/photography deck at Maliba Lodge

How to get there 
The route passes through the village of Khabo and parallels the Hlotse river along the Holomo valley until it reaches the park entrance gate.

Notes

References 

The Lesotho Highlands Development Authority
Lesotho - Kingdom in the Sky by Afrika Museum, Beg en Dal, 1993

National parks of Lesotho
Butha-Buthe District